Israel Krupp (9 March 1908 – 25 October 1991) was a Norwegian footballer. He played in one match for the Norway national football team in 1930.

References

External links
 

1908 births
1991 deaths
Norwegian footballers
Norway international footballers
Place of birth missing
Association footballers not categorized by position